Carson High School is a four-year public high school in Carson, California, United States. It is situated in the District South area of the Los Angeles Unified School District.  Carson High is located on the corner of 223rd Street and Main Street. Carson's rivalry with Banning High School in Wilmington, Los Angeles, California is one of the top high school rivalries in the South Bay region of Los Angeles. Enrollment at Carson High School for the 2018–2019 academic year was 1,499 students.

Academies
Carson High School is made up of four learning academies: 

 Environmental Science, Engineering & Technology (ESET)
 Global Business, Law & Government Academy (GBLG)
 Performing Arts & Media Academy (PAMA)
 The Musical Arts and Digital Arts Magnet (M.E.DI.A) 

The school offers 10 Advanced Placement (AP) courses, as well as several extracurricular programs, which include MCJROTC (Marine Corps Junior Reserve Officers' Training Corps), Marching Blue Thunder (a combined color guard, marching band, and dance team), cheerleading, and drama.

School profile
According to the California Department of Education, in the 2019–2020 school year, there were a total of 1,499 students attending Carson High Steam School, comprising the following ethnic origins.

54.7% Hispanic or Latino  
17.2% African American
16.8% Filipino 
3.9% Pacific Islander  
2.9% White 
2.7% Asian  
0.1% Native American  
Teachers: 65
Student-teacher ratio: 1:23
Most recent SAT participation rate is 63%, with an average score of 1065 (2019)

Sports

Quarterback Perry Klein helped the Colts win the 1988 City Section 4-A Division championship, as he was named California State Player of the Year, Parade Magazine High School All-America, and a Campbell Soup All-American.
The Carson Girls' Tennis team was undefeated in Marine League for 12 consecutive years from 1998 to 2010; highest record 129-0 matches.
The Carson High School 'Marching Blue Thunder,' consisting of Carson's marching band, drill team, color guard (tall flags), flaggies (short flags), and banner girls, won 6 consecutive LAUSD Band & Drill Team Championships in 1983, 1984, 1985, 1986, 1987, and 1988.
The Carson Flaggies were featured in Gwen Stefani's "Hollaback Girl" video in 2005.
The Carson Cheer and Song Team won USA National titles in the Show Cheer Division and Song/Pom in 2006 & 2007. 
The Song team also placed 1st at UCA/ UDA 2006 West Coast Championships 2009 Sharp National Champions 2010 United Spirit Association National Winners, Ranked 9th in the Nations
In 1980/1981 the team was featured in Toni Basils popular song "Mickey" music video.

Notable alumni

Ab-Soul, hip hop artist
Ray J, singer, television personality
Tony Caldwell, former NFL player
 Perry Klein (born 1971), former NFL quarterback
J. R. Redmond, former NFL player
Brian Treggs, former NFL player
Morris Unutoa, former NFL player
Wesley Walker, former NFL player
Mike Wilson, former NFL player
Roddy Ricch, hip hop artist
Terry Wilshusen, former MLB pitcher
Ekene Ibekwe, professional overseas basketball player

References

Los Angeles Unified School District schools
High schools in Los Angeles County, California
Buildings and structures in Carson, California
Public high schools in California
1963 establishments in California